Sievierodonetsk Raion is a raion (district) of Luhansk Oblast, Ukraine. It was created in July 2020 as part of the reform of administrative divisions of Ukraine. The center of the raion is the city of Sievierodonetsk. Population:

Villages
 Chervonopopivka
 Katerynivka, Sievierodonetsk Raion, Luhansk Oblast
 Lysychanskyi
 Novozvanivka
 Orikhove, Sievierodonetsk Raion
 Prychepylivka
 Shypylivka
 Sokilnyky, Sievierodonetsk Raion, Luhansk Oblast
 Synetskyi
 Troitske, Sievierodonetsk Raion
 Ustynivka, Sievierodonetsk Raion
 Verkhnokamyanka, Luhansk Oblast
 Voevodivka, Luhansk Oblast
 Zatyshne, Luhansk Oblast
 Zholobok, Sievierodonetsk Raion, Luhansk Oblast
 Zolotarivka, Luhansk Oblast

Urban-type settlements
The following are the Urban-type settlements: 
 Bilohorivka, Luhansk Oblast
 Borivske, Luhansk Oblast
 Komyshuvakha, Sievierodonetsk Raion, Luhansk Oblast
 Maloriazantseve
 Metiolkine
 Myrna Dolyna
 Novotoshkivske
 Nyzhnie, Luhansk Oblast
 Syrotyne, Sievierodonetsk Raion, Luhansk Oblast
 Toshkivka
 Voronove, Luhansk Oblast
 Vovchoiarivka
 Vrubivka

See also
 
 
 List of hromadas of Ukraine#Luhansk Oblast
 List of urban-type settlements in Ukraine

References

Raions of Luhansk Oblast
Ukrainian raions established during the 2020 administrative reform